Graphidivalva is a genus of moths belonging to the family Tineidae. It contains only one species, Graphidivalva genitalis, which is found in South Africa.

This species has a wingspan of 11–12 mm.

References

Endemic moths of South Africa
Myrmecozelinae
Monotypic moth genera
Moths of Africa
Lepidoptera of South Africa